Intime may refer to:

Music
Intime (Christophe album), first acoustic live album by Christophe 2014
Intime (Maya Berović album), Bosnian-language pop album by Maya Berović 2020
Intime, French-language DVD album by Lara Fabian 2002

Business
Intime, Chinese department store chain, part of Alibaba Group
INtime, RMX operating system

See also
In Time (disambiguation)